is a former baseball player from Japan.  He played in the Central League for Taiyō Whales  Doi played as a catcher

References

1933 births
Living people
Baseball people from Okayama Prefecture
Meiji University alumni
Japanese baseball players
Taiyō Whales players
Managers of baseball teams in Japan
Yokohama DeNA BayStars managers